Robert McClory (January 31, 1908 – July 24, 1988) was a U.S. Representative from Illinois.

Born in Riverside, Illinois, McClory attended the public schools, L'Institut Sillig, Vevey, Switzerland from 1925 to 1926, and Dartmouth College in Hanover, New Hampshire from 1926 to 1928. He graduated from Chicago–Kent College of Law in 1932. He was admitted to the bar in 1932 and thereafter engaged in the practice of law in state and federal courts in Cook and Lake counties. He was the village attorney of Lake Bluff, Illinois, and was the ScoutMaster of Lake Bluff Boy Scout Troop 42. He served in the United States Marine Corps Reserve 1933–1937.

McClory was elected to the Illinois House of Representatives in 1950 and to the Illinois Senate in 1952, 1956, and 1960.

McClory was one of seven Republicans on the House Judiciary Committee to vote for articles of impeachment against President Richard Nixon.

McClory was elected as a Republican to the Eighty-eighth and to the nine succeeding Congresses (January 3, 1963 – January 3, 1983). He was not a candidate for reelection to the Ninety-ninth Congress. He resumed the practice of law in Washington, D.C. He was United States delegate to the Inter-Parliamentary Union Conference from 1963 to 1982, and honorary delegate, 1983 to 1988. He was a resident of Washington, D.C., until his death there on July 24, 1988.

References

External links

 "Nixon Impeachment", by Mike McClory

|-

1908 births
1988 deaths
Dartmouth College alumni
Chicago-Kent College of Law alumni
People from Riverside, Illinois
Illinois lawyers
Republican Party Illinois state senators
Republican Party members of the Illinois House of Representatives
United States Marines
Republican Party members of the United States House of Representatives from Illinois
20th-century American politicians
20th-century American lawyers
People from Lake Bluff, Illinois